Bill Schindler (March 6, 1909 – September 20, 1952) was an American racecar driver.

He began racing in 1931 in a sprint car. He was racing midget cars on the East Coast of the United States at their introduction in 1934. Schindler lost his left leg from above the knee while racing in a Champ car race in 1936 at Mineola, Long Island. He is one of three drivers to have participated in the Indianapolis 500 with a prosthetic leg.

Schindler was part of a group determined to keep the AAA out of the East Coast in 1937. He was elected president of the "outlaw" group. Schindler briefly switched to the AAA in 1940, and won the Bronx Coliseum Indoor championship. He returned to his "outlaw" past when he was named the president of the newly formed American Racing Drivers Club (ARDC). He served as president for the club's first six years. Schindler won ARDC championships in 1940, 1945, 1946 and 1948. In both 1947 and 1948 he won 53 midget car feature races, which helped bring popularity to midget car racing in the Northeastern United States.

Schindler joined the AAA so he could race in the Indianapolis 500 in 1950, 1951, and 1952.

Schindler died in a sprint car racing crash in Allentown, Pennsylvania, in 1952.  Schindler was leading the race on the third lap when a car driven by Paul Becker lost a wheel and skidded into the fence.  He did not see the "go slow" sign that was immediately waved after Becker's crash and his black Offenhauser hit the wheel, crashed through the fence and tumbled down a 20-foot embankment.  He was killed instantly.

Career awards
He was inducted in the National Sprint Car Hall of Fame in 1998.
He was inducted in the National Midget Auto Racing Hall of Fame in 1985.
He was inducted in the New England Auto Racers Hall of Fame in 2004.

Complete AAA Championship Car results

Indy 500 results

World Championship career summary
The Indianapolis 500 was part of the FIA World Championship from 1950 through 1960. Drivers competing at Indy during those years were credited with World Championship  points and participation. Bill Schindler participated in three World Championship races, but scored no World Championship points.

References

1909 births
1952 deaths
Indianapolis 500 drivers
Racing drivers who died while racing
National Sprint Car Hall of Fame inductees
Sports deaths in Pennsylvania
People from Middletown, Orange County, New York
Racing drivers from New York (state)
AAA Championship Car drivers